Lucien Descaves (16 March 1861– 6 September 1949) was a French novelist.

Selected works
 Le Calvaire de Héloïse Pajadou (1883) [Héloïse Pajadou's Calvary. Sunny Lou Publishing , 2021]

Further reading

External links
 
 Archive of Lucien Descaves Papers at the International Institute of Social History

1861 births
1949 deaths
Writers from Paris
19th-century French novelists
20th-century French novelists
Place of death missing
French male novelists
19th-century French male writers
20th-century French male writers

French anarchists